IHR may stand for:
 International Health Regulations, a set of legally binding regulations aimed at limiting the spread of disease
 Institute for Historical Review, an American Holocaust denial organization
 Institute of Historical Research, an educational institution forming part of the University of London